A History of Loneliness is a novel written by Irish-Canadian novelist John Boyne. It was first published in 2014 by Doubleday.

Reference 

2014 Irish novels
Novels by John Boyne
Doubleday (publisher) books